Mario Teguh (born Sis Maryono Teguh; March 5, 1956) is an Indonesian motivational speaker and consultant. In 2010, Teguh has been listed as one of 8 Personality Changes version of newspaper Republika. Teguh had more popularity in public when he was a presenter for Mario Teguh Golden Ways in Metro TV.

Before he began his career, Teguh had been working in several banks, such as Citibank, BSB Bank, and Aspac Bank. Teguh was also establishing for his businessman Exnal Corp Jakarta where he served as CEO and senior consultant. Teguh presented a show, titled Business Art on O Channel. Teguh is one of the most expensive motivator in Indonesia.

Career 
 Citibank Indonesia (1983–1986) as Head of Sales
 BSB Bank (1986–1989) as Manager Business Development
 Aspac Bank (1990–1994) as Vice President Marketing & Organization Development
 Exnal Corp Jakarta (1994–present) as CEO & Senior Consultant
 Specialization: Business Effectiveness Consultant

Education 
 Department of Architecture New Trier West High (level SMA) in Chicago, United States, 1975.
 Department of Linguistics and language education, Institut Keguruan dan Ilmu Pendidikan Malang (S-1).
 Department of International Business, Sophia University, Tokyo, Japan.
 Department of Operations Systems, Indiana University, United States, 1983 (MBA).

Books 
 Becoming a Star (2006)
 One Million Second Chances (2006)
 Life Changer (2009)
 Leadership Golden Ways (2009)

References 

1956 births
Living people
People from Makassar
Indonesian people of Chinese descent
Indonesian writers
Indonesian businesspeople